Giorgio Sbruzzi (born 13 March 1955) is an Italian sprint canoer who competed from the mid to late 1970s. He won a silver medal in the K-2 10000 m event at the 1975 ICF Canoe Sprint World Championships in Belgrade.

Sbruzzi also competed in the K-2 1000 m event at the 1976 Summer Olympics in Montreal, but was eliminated in the semifinal round.

References

1955 births
Canoeists at the 1976 Summer Olympics
Italian male canoeists
Living people
Olympic canoeists of Italy
ICF Canoe Sprint World Championships medalists in kayak
20th-century Italian people